The Seventh Juror is a 1962 French crime drama directed by Georges Lautner, starring Bernard Blier, Maurice Biraud, Francis Blanche and Danièle Delorme. It tells the story of a man who murders a young woman; when the woman's boyfriend is wrongly accused of the murder, the actual killer is chosen to serve in the jury, but does not want an innocent man to be convicted. The film is based on the novel The Seventh Juror by Francis Didelot. Principal photography took place from 14 November to 23 December 1961. The film had 1,171,911 admissions in France.

Cast
 Bernard Blier as Grégoire Duval
 Maurice Biraud as Veterinarian
 Francis Blanche as Attorney General
 Danièle Delorme as Geneviève Duval
 Jacques Riberolles as Sylvain Sautral
 Yves Barsacq as Maître Adreux
 Catherine Le Couey as Mme. Souchon
 Robert Dalban as Fisherman
 Anne Doat as Alice Moreux
 Madeleine Geoffroy as Mme. Sylvestre
 Françoise Giret as Catherine
 Camille Guérini as Judge
 Charles Lavialle as Preceptor

References

1962 crime drama films
1962 films
Films based on French novels
Films directed by Georges Lautner
French crime drama films
1960s French-language films
1960s French films